Deli Zal Beyg (also Romanized as Delī Z̄āl Beyg, Dālī Zāl Beyg, Dālī Zāl Bag, Dālī Zālbak, Dālīzālbek, and Delī Zālbak; also known as Delī Zāl va Bek, Delī, and Delī Zāl ow Bek) is a village in Dehpir-e Shomali Rural District, in the Central District of Khorramabad County, Lorestan Province, Iran. At the 2006 census, its population was 91, in 18 families.

References 

Towns and villages in Khorramabad County